The Pichi Picún Leufú Dam (in Spanish Embalse Pichi Picún Leufú) is the third of five dams on the Limay River in northwestern Argentine Patagonia (the Comahue region), near the town of Piedra del Águila.

The dam is used for the generation of hydroelectricity and for the regulation of the flow. It was built by the Sweden-based multinational Skanska, and inaugurated in 2000.

It employs three vertical-axis Kaplan turbines.

References
  Secretaría de Energía. República Argentina. Embalse Pichi Picún Leufú.
  Región Comahue.
  Skanska LA. Central Hidroeléctrica Pichi Picún Leufú.

External links

Dams completed in 2000
Energy infrastructure completed in 2000
Dams in Argentina
Hydroelectric power stations in Argentina
Buildings and structures in Neuquén Province
Buildings and structures in Río Negro Province
Dams on the Limay River